If You Ever Think I Will Stop Goin' in Ask RR (Royal Rich) is the fifth mixtape by American recording artist Rich Homie Quan. It was released on April 28, 2015, by T.I.G. Entertainment exclusively on MyMixtapez. The mixtapes features no guest appearances, and production is handled by K.E. on the Track, London on da Track, The Mekanics, Izze The Producer, DJ Spinz, Trauma Tone, Only 1 Scoota, DT Spacely, Nitti Beatz, Jescarp, Yung Lan, Yung Carter, The Yardeez, Goose and Wheezy.

Background
In September 2014, Rich Gang released their collaborative mixtape, Rich Gang: Tha Tour Pt. 1. The mixtape received generally favourable reviews and has been viewed over five million times on LiveMixtapes, but the follow-up was delayed, due to them returning to their solo projects with a return a possibility in the future. While having to spend some time returning his attention to his career, Rich Homie Quan is hoping to bring a new sound using a variety of voice techniques and lyricism to bring his music to a wider audience. The mixtape was named, after his son Royal Rich.

Track listing

References

2015 mixtape albums
Albums produced by London on da Track
Rich Homie Quan albums
Sequel albums